The Sisters of the Poor, Palazzolo Institute  (abbreviation: S.d.P.I.P.) is a religious institute of pontifical right whose members profess public vows of chastity, poverty, and obedience and follow the evangelical way of life in common.

Their mission includes service to the poor, care of orphans and nursing.

This religious institute was founded in Bergamo, Italy, in 1869, by St. Luigi Maria Palazzolo, with the help of Maria Teresa Gabrieli. The institute received pontifical status in 1912.

The sisters have houses in Brazil, Burkina Faso, Congo, Italy, Ivory Coast, Kenya, Malawi, Peru, Switzerland. The Generalate of the Congregation can be found in Bergamo, Italy.

On 31 December 2008 there are 836 sisters in 103 communities.

References

External links
 Palazzolo Institute official site

Catholic female orders and societies
Religious organizations established in 1869
Catholic religious institutes established in the 19th century
1869 establishments in Italy